Souphi is a khum (commune) of Ou Chrov District in Banteay Meanchey Province in north-western Cambodia.

Villages

 Souphi Cheung(សុភីជើង)
 Souphi Kandal(សុភីកណ្ដាល)
 Souphi Tboung(សុភីត្បូង)
 Kouk Chak
 Kouk Prich Chak Thmey

References

Communes of Banteay Meanchey province
Ou Chrov District